Gymnotus is a genus of Neotropical freshwater fish in the family Gymnotidae found widely in South America, Central America and southern Mexico (36th parallel south to 18th parallel north). The greatest species richness is found in the Amazon basin. They are sometimes referred to by the English name banded knifefish, although this typically is reserved for the most widespread species, G. carapo. Overall Gymnotus is the most widespread genus in the order Gymnotiformes.

Although not commonly eaten by humans, some members of this genus are used locally as fishing bait, and occasionally kept in aquariums.

Habitat
Gymnotus occur in virtually any freshwater habitat in their range, even those with little oxygen (survives by breathing air directly from the water surface), areas affected by pollution, and for a period on land if their aquatic habitat dries out. Large species tend to live near floating vegetation along the edges of large rivers or floodplains, while smaller tend to live among leaf-litter or near banks of small streams. The genus includes both widespread and common species that occur in many different habitat types, and more restricted and rare species that occur in fewer habitats. There are species that remain in the same habitat throughout their lives, while others breed in specific habitats and spend the rest of their time elsewhere. At least as many as five species of Gymnotus may occur together in the same region and habitat.

Behavior
Gymnotus species are nocturnal and mainly feed on aquatic insects, crustaceans, small fish and other small animals, but may also take plant material. Being electric fish, they generate weak electric fields used for navigation, finding prey and communicating with other individuals of their species. At least some species are highly territorial and will react aggressively if detecting the electric field of another individual of their species, especially between conspecific males. The electric signal is species specific, and tends to differ between males and females. However, Gymnotus are not able to generate a strong electric field that can be used for incapacitating prey or enemies, like the related electric eel.

Nothing is known about the breeding behavior of most members of this genus, but in two species, G. carapo and G. mamiraua, males make a "nest" (a depression in the bottom in the former species and within vegetation in floating meadows in the latter) and guard the young. Additionally, males of at least G. carapo will mouthbrood.

Appearance
Gymnotus are generally brownish with a banded pattern, but this can also be more mottled or spotted in some species. Small scales are always present on these fish. The mouth is superior, meaning it is turned upwards. The anal fin terminates at a point near the tip of the tail. Like other Neotropical knifefish, they often lose their tail due to attacks by predators or aggressive encounters with conspecifics, but they are able to regenerate it.

Species
There are currently 46 recognized species divided into six subgenera in Gymnotus:

Subgenus Gymnotus (Gymnotus)

Subgenus Gymnotus (Lamontiana)

Subgenus Gymnotus (Pantherus)
 Gymnotus capitimaculatus Rangel-Pereira, 2014
 Gymnotus pantherinus (Steindachner, 1908)
 Gymnotus refugio Giora & L. R. Malabarba, 2016
Subgenus Gymnotus (Tijax)
 Gymnotus cylindricus La Monte, 1935
 Gymnotus maculosus J. S. Albert & R. R. Miller, 1995 (Spotted knifefish)
 Gymnotus panamensis J. S. Albert & Crampton, 2003

Subgenus Gymnotus (Tigre)

Subgenus Gymnotus (Tigrinus)

References

Gymnotidae
Fish of South America
Freshwater fish genera
Taxa named by Carl Linnaeus